Hans Fries ( – ) was a Swiss painter before the Reformation.

Fries was born in Fribourg, the son of a baker, and studied with the Bernese painter Heinrich Bichler. After a stay in Basel in the year 1487/88, he returned to his hometown. Here he held the official post of city painter in the first decade of the 16th Century and was in addition a councilman. During this time he designed and painted many altars. Around 1510 he moved to Berne where he lived until his death.

Selected works 
 Christ carrying the Cross, 1502, canvas, 81×164 cm, Berne Kunstmuseum (Art Museum)
 Wing of a St. John altar, outside: St. John Drinks the Poison, c. 1507, wood, 130×32 cm, Zürich, Swiss National Museum
Wing of a St. John altar, inside: Two Visions of St. John, c. 1507, wood, 130×32 cm, Zürich, Swiss National Museum
St. Barbara (Altar wing), 1503, wood, 98×67 cm, Fribourg, Musée d'Art et d'Histoire
St. Christopher (Altar wing), 1503, wood, 98×67 cm, Fribourg, Musée d'Art et d'Histoire.
St. Margareta (Altar wing), c. 1505, wood, 97×30 cm, Fribourg, Musée d'Art et d'Histoire.
St. Nikolaus (Altar wing), c. 1505, wood, 97×30 cm, Fribourg, Musée d'Art et d'Histoire.
Allegory of the Cross, c. 1515, wood, 148×98 cm, Fribourg, Musée d'Art et d'Histoire.
from a John the Baptist Triptych, left wing outside: Sermon of John the Baptist before Herod, 1514, Wood, 124×76 cm, Basel, Kunstmuseum
from a John the Baptist Triptych, left wing inside: The Beheading of John the Baptist, 1514, wood, 124×76 cm, Basel, Kunstmuseum
from a St. John Triptych, right wing inside: John the Evangelist in Boiling Oil, 1514, wood, 125×75 cm, Basel, Kunstmuseum

See also
Heinrich Bichler

References 
 (1927) Die Kunst des Hans Fries Studien zur deutschen Kunstgeschichte No. 245, J.H. Ed. Heitz, Strasbourg, pp. 1–22
 (ed.) (1969) "Fries, Hans (1465?-1523)" McGraw-Hill Dictionary of Art McGraw-Hill, New York, 
 &  (eds.) (2001), Hans Fries 1460-1523: Ein Maler an der Zeitenwende, Hirmer, Munich.

External links 

Hans Fries. Ein Maler an der Zeitenwende in German

1460s births
1520s deaths
People from Fribourg
Swiss-German people
15th-century Swiss painters
16th-century Swiss painters
Swiss male painters